R Equulei is a class M Mira variable star in the constellation Equuleus.  Its brightness varies between a minimum magnitude of 15.0 to a maximum of 8.7 with an average period of 261 days.

References

External links
 

M-type giants
Mira variables
Emission-line stars

Equuleus
Durchmusterung objects
202051
Equulei, R